Conus humerosus is a fossil species of sea snail, a marine gastropod mollusk in the family Conidae, the cone snails, cone shells or cones.

Description
The size of the shell attains 65 mm.

Distribution
This marine species is only found as a fossil in the Neogene of the Dominican Republic.

References

 Pilsbry, .Revision of W. M. Gabb's Tertiary Mollusca of Santo Domingo; Proceedings of the Academy of Natural Sciences of Philadelphia v. 73 (1921)
 Hendricks J.R. (2015). Glowing seashells: diversity of fossilized coloration patterns on coral reef-associated cone snail (Gastropoda: Conidae) shells from the Neogene of the Dominican Republic. PLoS ONE. 10(4): e0120924

External links
 To World Register of Marine Species

humerosus